Mark Evans may refer to:
Mark Evans (footballer, born 1970), English professional footballer who played for Bradford City and Scarborough as a goalkeeper
Mark Evans (footballer, born 1982), English professional footballer who played for Wrexham as a defender
Mark Evans (comedian), British comedian and comedy writer
Mark Evans (general) (born 1953), general in the Australian Army
Mark Evans (musician) (born 1956), Australian bass guitar player with AC/DC and other Australian rock bands
Mark Evans (rower) (born 1957), Canadian rower
Mark Evans (rugby union), English rugby player
Mark Evans (TV presenter), TV presenter and veterinary surgeon
Mark Evans Austad (1917–1988),  Mark Evans, Washington, DC, radio and TV commentator and US Ambassador to Finland and Norway
Mark Evans (actor) (born 1985), Welsh actor
Mark Evans (soccer) (born 1962), American soccer defender
Mark Evans (explorer) (born 1961), British explorer and author

Fictional characters
Mark Evans, the protagonist of the 1993 film The Good Son
Mark Evans (Japanese: Mamoru Endō), the protagonist of association football video games and anime series Inazuma Eleven

See also
Marc Evans (born 1963), film director
Marcus Evans (disambiguation)